Scarcity, in the area of social psychology, works much like scarcity in the area of economics. Scarcity is basically how people handle satisfying themselves regarding unlimited wants and needs with resources that are limited. Humans place a higher value on an object that is scarce, and a lower value on those that are in abundance. For example diamonds are more valuable than rocks because diamonds are not as abundant. These perceptions of scarcity can lead to irregular consumer behavior, such as systemic errors or cognitive bias.

There are two social psychology principles that work with scarcity that increase its powerful force.  One is social proof.  This is a contributing factor to the effectiveness of scarcity, because if a product is sold out, or inventory is extremely low, humans interpret that to mean the product must be good since everyone else appears to be buying it.  The second contributing principle to scarcity is commitment.  If someone has already committed themselves to something, then find out they cannot have it, it makes the person want the item more.

Although people usually think of scarcity in a physical manner, it is important to note that the 'product' in short supply can also be abstract ideas such as time or energy.

Examples

This idea is deeply embedded in the intensely popular “Black Friday” shopping extravaganza that many United States consumers participate in every year on the day after Thanksgiving.  More than getting a bargain on a great gift, shoppers thrive on the competition itself, which is obtaining the scarce product.

Another example of the effects of scarcity is the phenomenon of panic buying, which drives people to display hoarding behaviors when faced with the possibility of going without a certain product. Historically, panic buying was seen during the COVID-19 pandemic in 2020. Due to the pandemic, people panic bought toilet paper out of fear of limited product supply, creating a shortage.

Effects of scarcity in humans 
Scarcity of resources can create frustration due to the inability to obtain the coveted item.

Hoarding 
Scarcity is also considered by some to encourage hoarding behavior. Researchers have found that when consumers are faced with perceived scarcity, they may become overwhelmed by the fear of needing an item and not having it. This can lead to unnecessary buying and hoarding of items that are already in short supply. This in turn creates a cycle of scarcity in which people are so afraid of going without a needed item, they buy all they are able, thus furthering the actual scarcity of the item.

Impulse buying 
Impulse buying can also be a side effect of perceived scarcity.  When people are faced with the possibility of having to go without an item, they often times will buy it, with no regard to whether or not it is actually needed.  This, similarly to hoarding, often stems from a sense of urgency that develops when an item is perceived to be scarce.

Heuristics
Heuristics are basically mental shortcuts to be able to make judgement calls quickly.  We use heuristics to speed up our decision-making process when an exhaustive, deliberative process is perceived to be impractical or unnecessary.  Thus heuristics are simple, efficient rules, which have developed through either evolutionary proclivities or past learning. While these “rules” work well in most circumstances, there are certain situations where they can lead to systemic errors or cognitive bias.

According to Robert Cialdini, the scarcity heuristic leads us to make biased decisions on a daily basis. It is particularly common to be biased by the scarcity heuristic when assessing quantity, rarity, and time.

Quantity
The simplest manifestation of the scarcity heuristic is the fear of losing access to some resource resulting from the possession of a small or diminishing quantity of the asset. For example, your favorite shirt becomes more valuable when you know you cannot replace it. If you had ten shirts of the same style and color, losing one would likely be less distressful because you have several others to take its place.

Rarity
Objects can increase in value if they have unique properties, or are exceptionally difficult to replicate. Collectors of rare baseball cards or stamps are simple examples of the principle of rarity.

Time
When faced with a short amount of time, the decision may be rushed and made in haste, leaving room for error in decision making.

Studies
Numerous studies have been conducted on the topic of scarcity in social psychology:

Scarcity rhetoric in a job advertisement for restaurant server positions has been investigated. Subjects were presented with two help-wanted ads, one of which suggested numerous job vacancies, while the other suggested that very few were available. The study found that subjects who were presented with the advertisement that suggested limited positions available viewed the company as being a better one to work for than the one that implied many job positions were available. Subjects also felt that the advertisement that suggested limited vacancies translated to higher wages. In short, subjects placed a positive, higher value on the company that suggested that there were scarce job vacancies available.
Another study examined how the scarcity of men may lead women to seek high-paying careers and to delay starting a family. This effect was driven by how the sex ratio altered the mating market, not just the job market. Sex ratios involving a scarcity of men led women to seek lucrative careers because of the difficulty women have in finding an investing, long-term mate under such circumstances.

Conditional variations
Although the scarcity heuristic can always affect judgment and perception, certain situations exacerbate the effect. New scarcity and competition are common cases.

New scarcity
New scarcity occurs when our irrational desire for limited resources increases when we move from a state of abundance to a state of scarcity. This is in line with psychological reactance theory, which states that a person will react strongly when they perceive that their options are likely to be lessened in the future.

 demonstrated this principle with a simple experiment. They divided people into two groups, giving one group a jar of ten cookies and another a jar with only two cookies. When asked to rate the quality of the cookie the group with two, in line with the scarcity heuristic, found the cookies more desirable. The researchers then added a new element. Some participants were first given a jar of ten cookies, but before participants could sample the cookie, experimenters removed 8 cookies so that there were again only two. The group first having ten but then were reduced to two, rated the cookies more desirable than both of the other groups.

Competition
In situations when others are directly competing for scarce resources, the value we assign to objects is further inflated. Advertisers commonly take advantage of scarcity heuristics by marketing products as “hot items” or by telling customers that certain goods will sell out quickly.

Effects of scarcity in animals 

Scarcity is not only seen in humans.  It can also be seen in the behavior of animals. In fact, one example of scarcity in animals is water. Livestock animals have bodies that are more than half water in volume. The smaller and indigenous animals are more tolerant due to their size.  The smaller animals require less water and are better able to survive in areas where water is scarce.

Hoarding is also found in some species of birds and even rodents.  This hoarding is typically food.  The birds and rodents commonly store up food and hide it in a place that is out of reach for other animals.

Scarcity mentality 

Scarcity can be more than a physical limitation.  It also involves the frontal lobe in the brain, which is in charge of making decisions. It can also affect how people think and feel. When there are not enough resources, whether financial or time, challenges are created for the human cognitive system. This presents problems such as impulsive behavior which likely impairs performance. These people also exhibit lowered intellectual abilities and more forgetful behaviors. With these impairments and deficits, performance is actually lowered and that causes behaviors that actually worsen the effects of scarcity.

See also
Artificial scarcity
Principle of least interest

References

Bibliography

Further reading

Social psychology
Scarcity